Mink Brook is a  stream in western New Hampshire in the United States. It is a tributary of the Connecticut River, which flows to Long Island Sound.

Mink Brook lies entirely in the town of Hanover. It rises on the western slopes of Moose Mountain and flows west, through the village of Etna, before reaching the Connecticut just north of the Hanover-Lebanon municipal boundary.

See also

List of rivers of New Hampshire

References
 New Hampshire GRANIT geographic information system: 1:25,000-scale digital hydrographic data derived from U.S. Geological Survey topographic maps

Rivers of New Hampshire
Tributaries of the Connecticut River
Rivers of Grafton County, New Hampshire